Stapfiella lucida is a shrub native to Burundi, Congo, Rwana, and Zaïre. It reaches heights of 1.5 – 3 meters high, shiny 4–5 cm leaves that cluster at the top of branches, yellowish white homostylous flowers, and chestnut colored seeds.

Varieties 
There are currently two accepted varieties of S. lucida, var. lucida and var. pubescens (Verdc.).

Variety pubescens is restricted to the wet tropics of Burundi. It differs from var. lucida as it has less acuminate capsule and more densely pubescent capsule. Prior to the discovery of var. pubescens, S. lucida had not been documented in Burundi. Var. pubescens is endangered.

References 

Flora of Burundi
Flora of the Democratic Republic of the Congo
Flora of the Republic of the Congo
Flora of Rwanda
Shrubs
Passifloraceae